Bletia catenulata is a species of orchid native to Ecuador, Peru, Brazil, Colombia, Bolivia and Paraguay.

References

External links 

IOSPE orchid photo
Brazil Plants
AgrOriente, Orquídeas Amazonicas (Mayobamba Perú), Galería Virtual

catenulata
Orchids of Ecuador
Orchids of Peru
Orchids of Brazil
Orchids of Bolivia
Flora of Paraguay
Orchids of Colombia
Plants described in 1798